Lizards Foot is a rocky spur forming the east end of the Saint Johns Range in Victoria Land, Antarctica. It was charted and named by the British Antarctic Expedition under Robert Falcon Scott, 1910–13.

References

Ridges of Victoria Land
Scott Coast